Cork Albert Street railway station was on the Cork, Blackrock and Passage Railway (CBPR) in County Cork, Ireland.

History

The station opened on 6 February 1873 replacing the former terminus of Cork Victoria Road railway station.

Regular passenger services were withdrawn on 12 September 1932.

Routes

Further reading

References

Disused railway stations in County Cork
Railway stations opened in 1873
Railway stations closed in 1932